Fernando Martínez Perales (born 21 May 1967), commonly known as Nando, is a Spanish retired professional footballer who played as a left-back, also a manager.

In his career, the majority of which was spent at Valencia and Deportivo, he totalled 413 games across the two top tiers of Spanish football over 14 seasons. Of those, 343 were in La Liga (15 goals).

Club career
Born in Valencia, Nando began his career with local club Levante UD, but moved across town to La Liga's Valencia CF after securing promotion from Tercera División in 1987. An attacking-minded fullback who started his career as a midfielder, he spent five seasons at the latter, but started less frequently in his final two years following the arrival of Brazilian Leonardo.

Nando joined Deportivo de La Coruña on a free transfer in the summer of 1992, which also saw Adolfo Aldana, Bebeto and Mauro Silva arrive at the Estadio Riazor. During his spell, the Galician side began their rise to Super Depor fame, winning its first two trophies – the Copa del Rey and the Supercopa de España, both in 1995 – which were the player's first and only honours.

Following the arrival of John Toshack as Deportivo manager in 1995, Nando once again found himself increasingly on the sidelines. Although he regained first-choice status for the 1996–97 season he lost his place to Frenchman Jérôme Bonnissel in the following, and signed with Segunda División team Sevilla FC in January 1998 after five and a half years and 202 competitive appearances.

Nando helped the Andalusians to promote to the top flight in his first full season, but suffered immediate relegation in a campaign in which he played 30 league matches, and met the same fate the following year with second-tier SD Compostela, after which he retired from professional football aged 34, going on to compete at amateur level with Atlético Arteixo.

International career
Nando made his debut for Spain on 14 September 1988 in a 1–2 friendly loss to Yugoslavia, in Oviedo. His second – and final – appearance came four and a half years later in a 1–1 draw with Mexico, another exhibition game which was played in Las Palmas.

References

External links

CiberChe stats and bio 

1967 births
Living people
Spanish footballers
Footballers from Valencia (city)
Association football defenders
La Liga players
Segunda División players
Segunda División B players
Tercera División players
Levante UD footballers
Valencia CF Mestalla footballers
Valencia CF players
Deportivo de La Coruña players
Sevilla FC players
SD Compostela footballers
Spain under-21 international footballers
Spain international footballers
Spanish football managers
Tercera División managers
Pontevedra CF managers
Spanish expatriate sportspeople in Armenia